The Xi'an Conservatory of Music is a music school located at Xi'an, Shaanxi, China.

History 
The college was founded in 1949, formerly known as the "Northwest Military and Political University College of Art". The school changed its name to the "Northwest College of Art Department of Music" in 1950. The school combined its music department and fine art department into the Northwest Technical School of Art in 1953, and the Xi'an Technical School of Music was founded in 1956 at the site of the school's music department. The school changed its name to the Xi'an Conservatory of Music in 1960.

The conservatory includes departments in composition, vocal music, folk music, orchestral music, piano, musical education, and dance. Its attached pre-college school (grades 7-12) currently has over 4000 students. The conservatory's president is Zhao Jiping.

References

External links 

 
Music schools in China
Education in Xi'an
1949 establishments in China
Educational institutions established in 1949